This is a list of current and former notable sealed archives.

Current

Former

See also
 List of public disclosures of classified information

References

Sealed